These are the Canadian number-one country songs of 1992, per the RPM Country Tracks chart.

See also
1992 in music
List of number-one country hits of 1992 (U.S.)

References
Citations

External links
 Read about RPM Magazine at the AV Trust
 Search RPM charts here at Library and Archives Canada

1992 in Canadian music
Canada Country
1992